The Roadwater railway station was an intermediate station on the West Somerset Mineral Railway (WSMR), which was built primarily to carry iron ore from mines to Watchet harbour in Somerset, England. The line was unconnected to any other, though it passed under what is now the West Somerset Railway north of Roadwater.

The line's seven stations were designed by Rice Hopkins. Roadwater was one of the five which showed a clear family resemblance. It offered the usual goods, coal and passenger facilities. A Temperance Hall was built nearby.

Services
The stone-built station opened for goods traffic in 1857. A passenger service began in September 1865, connecting Watchet with the village of Washford and the hamlets of Roadwater and Comberow.

The initial passenger service consisted of four trains a day out and back.

Like other railways built to serve one industry, such as iron ore carrying lines in Cumbria, the WSMR's fortunes were at the mercy of that industry. Iron and steel making was given to boom and bust and suffered a significant downturn in the 1870s, exacerbated by imports of cheaper and better ore from abroad. The iron mines which provided the WSMR's staple traffic stuttered to complete closure between 1879 and 1883. The line did not close immediately, two mixed trains a day continued to run until 1898, when all traffic ceased.

In 1907 the Somerset Mineral Syndicate made an attempt to revive the line, reopening Colton mine and starting a new bore at Timwood. Apart from a reopening day special on 4 July 1907 no passenger service was provided. The venture collapsed in March 1910.

Abandonment
After closure in 1910 the line through Roadwater was subject to minimal maintenance until its metals were requisitioned for the war effort in 1917.

With neither track, rolling stock nor prospects an Act of Parliament was sought and passed to abandon the railway. Its assets were auctioned on 8 August 1924 and the company was wound up in 1925.

Evocative contemporary descriptions of the line in its later years have been preserved.

Afterlife
By 2016 much of the route could still be traced on the ground, on maps and on satellite images. The incline from Comberow to Brendon Hill is a Listed structure. Roadwater station has been extended as a bungalow, but remains unmistakably a former railway station.

References

Sources

Further reading

External links

Railway stations in Great Britain opened in 1865
Railway stations in Great Britain closed in 1898
Disused railway stations in Somerset